Ahu Türkpençe (born 2 January 1977) is a Turkish actress.

Biography
Ahu Türkpençe was born in Samsun on the Black Sea coast. Her sister is actress, Gözde Türkpençe. She was interested in theatre and with the help of a close friend, she joined the cast of the Müjdat Gezen Arts Center. Doing do, she put her studies in Physics at Yıldız Technical University on hold.  She had parts in the series Yedi Numara and Azad and gained fame for starring in Bir İstanbul Masalı. Türkpençe has also appeared in films such as Neredesin Firuze, Keloğlan Kara Prens'e Karşı, Dinle Neyden, Denizden Gelen and Kaybedenler Kulübü.

Filmography 
Gurbetçiler (1996)
Güzel Günler (1998)
Bize Ne Oldu (1999)
Yedi Numara (2000)
Azad (2002)
Bir İstanbul Masalı (2003)
Neredesin Firuze (2003)
Şöhret (2004)
Keloğlan Kara Prens'e Karşı (2006)
Asterix Vikinglere Karşı (2006)
Hicran Sokağı (2007)
Karamel (2008)
Dinle Neyden (2008)
Elveda Rumeli (2009)
Denizden Gelen (2009)
Ölü Yaprak Vuruşu (2009)
Bekle Beni (2010)
Sessiz Çocuklar (2010)
Ateşe Yürümek (2010)
Kaybedenler Kulübü (2011)
The Mountain 2 (2016)
Wolf, Börü (2018)

References

External links 
 

1977 births
Living people
People from Samsun
Turkish film actresses
Turkish stage actresses
Turkish television actresses
Best Actress Golden Boll Award winners
20th-century Turkish actresses